Like Father, Like Santa  (also known as The Christmas Takeover) is a TV movie starring Harry Hamlin and William Hootkins. It premiered on Fox Family in 1998 on their 25 Days of Christmas programming block. The script was written by Mark Valenti.

Plot

The story revolves around a toy tycoon named Tyler Madison (Harry Hamlin) who is greedy, ruthless, and neglectful of his family. He wants a monopoly of the toys industry and is determined to erase all his competitors including his father Santa Claus. Tyler had a bitter childhood which motivates him to put Santa Claus out of business. He travels to the North Pole to take over Santa's toy workshop. However, he realizes that he has a lot in common with his father and soon faces a crisis of conscience when the Christmas elves at his father's mailroom begin a Coup d'état.

Cast
 Harry Hamlin as Tyler Madison
 Megan Gallagher as Elise Madison
 Curtis Blanck as Danny Madison
 William Hootkins as Santa Claus
 Gary Coleman as Ignatius
 Michael Munoz as Whoops
 Roy Dotrice as Ambrose Booth
 Gary Frank as Smitty
 Stuart Pankin as Snipes

Reception

See also 
 List of Christmas films
 Santa Claus in film

References

External links
 
 Julie Ashton-Barson Filmography

1998 films
American Christmas films
Santa Claus in film
ABC Family original films
Santa Claus in television
Christmas television films